Jennifer Betty Olson (born 28 January 1945) is a New Zealand former cricketer who played primarily as a right-arm medium bowler. She appeared in one Test match in 1969 and four One Day Internationals in 1973 for New Zealand. She played domestic cricket for Canterbury and Southern Districts.

References

External links

1945 births
Living people
Cricketers from Christchurch
New Zealand women cricketers
New Zealand women Test cricketers
New Zealand women One Day International cricketers
Canterbury Magicians cricketers
Southern Districts women cricketers